Kiyoshi Kitagawa (北川 潔) (born December 5, 1958 in Osaka) is a Japanese-American jazz double-bassist.

Career
Kitagawa first played bass guitar, and was in a rock band as a high school student. He switched to double bass while a student at Kansei Gakuin Daigaku, and played in the 1980s with Sadayasu Fuji and Takashi Furuya. 
In October 1988, he immigrated to the United States, where he lived in New York City.
Kitagawa joined to Winard Harper's the Harper Brothers, and played with Kenny Barron, Andy Bey, Jon Faddis, Kenny Garrett, Jimmy Heath, Susannah McCorkle, Makoto Ozone, Ben Riley, and Terrell Stafford in the late 1980s and 1990s. 
He worked with Barron again several times in the 2000s, as well as with Brian Blade and Danny Grissett, and worked in the 2010s with Regina Carter and Charles McPherson.

Discography

As leader
 Ancestry (Atelier Sawano, 2004)
 Prayer (Atelier Sawano, 2005)
 Solo (Atelier Sawano, 2006)
 Live at Tsutenkaku (DVD-Video, Atelier Sawano, 2006)
 I'm Still Here (Atelier Sawano, 2007)
 Solo 2 (Atelier Sawano, 2008) – with photo album
 Live in Japan''' (Atelier Sawano, 2008) – compilation. live recorded in 2005.
 Walkin' Ahead (Atelier Sawano, 2015)
 Turning Point (Atelier Sawano, 2017)
 Spring Night (Atelier Sawano, 2020)

As sideman
With Makoto Ozone
 Makoto Ozone – The Trio (Polydor, 1997)
 Dear Oscar (Polydor, 1998)
 Three Wishes (Verve, 1998)
 No Strings Attached (Polydor, 1999)

With Kenny Barron
 Images (Sunnyside, 2003)
 The Traveler (Sunnyside, 2008)
 Book of Intuition (Impulse!, 2016)
 Concentric Circles (Blue Note, 2018)

With others
The Harper Brothers, Remembrance Live at The Village Vanguard (Verve, 1990)
Susannah McCorkle, From Bessie to Brazil (Concord Jazz, 1993)
Kenny Garrett, Triology (Warner Bros., 1995)
Jimmy Heath, You or Me (SteepleChase, 1995)
Terell Stafford, Fields of Gold (Nagel Heyer, 2000) – recorded in 1999
Jon Faddis, Teranga (Koch, 2006)

References

Kazunori Sugiyama, "Kiyoshi Kitagawa". The New Grove Dictionary of Jazz''. 2nd edition, ed. Barry Kernfeld, 2004.

Japanese jazz double-bassists
1958 births
Living people